The 1929 Oregon Webfoots football team represented the University of Oregon in the 1929 college football season. It was the Webfoots' 36th overall and 14th season as a member of the Pacific Coast Conference (PCC). The team was led by head coach John McEwan, in his fourth year, and played their home games at Hayward Field in Eugene and at Multnomah Field in Portland, Oregon. They finished the season with a record of seven wins, three losses (7–3 overall, 4–1 in the PCC).

Schedule

References

Oregon
Oregon Ducks football seasons
Oregon Webfoots football